Charles Boucher may refer to:
 Charles Boucher (priest) (1856–1940), Anglican priest
 Charles Eugene Boucher (1864–1926), Canadian politician
 Charles Hamilton Boucher (1898–1951), British Indian Army officer
 Charles Boucher (virologist) (1958–2021), Dutch virologist